Bad Blue Boys (BBB) are an ultras group who support the Croatian football club GNK Dinamo Zagreb and Futsal Dinamo.

History
Bad Blue Boys were officially founded on 17 March 1986 in Zagreb, with members from different areas of the city. The name of the group is said to have been inspired by the 1983 film starring Sean Penn, Bad Boys. Their mascot is a bulldog and their official anthem is "Dinamo ja volim" ("I love Dinamo"), by the Croatian rock band Pips, Chips & Videoclips. At home matches in Dinamo Zagreb's Maksimir Stadium, the Bad Blue Boys are located behind one goal in the North Stand. The groups has a Bulldog on its badge and as its mascot.

Zagreb journalist Andrej Krickovič argued that Bad Blue Boys were at the forefront of the nationalist movement in the country in 1990 and that they had offered their support to Franjo Tuđman (who became the first president of Croatia in the 1990s) in Croatia's first elections. And Saša Podgorelec, a Zagreb film director who made a documentary about the Bad Blue Boys, stated that they were, "conscious enough of their own identity and brave enough to express their wishes for Croatian independence ... when others were too frightened to say so." Later on, BBB turned against Martin Bedić who pushed for club's name to be changed to NK "Croatia". Tuđman was a frequent visitor of home games and would usually be greeted by stadium officials before the match started. This would always trigger loud whistling and chanting from Bad Blue Boys often forcing Live TV coverage to mute the audio.

In 2008 the group were involved in a controversy over graffiti daubed on the walls of the Zagrebački električni tramvaj building at Remiza, saying, "Death to Journalists, BBB ZG", which appeared on 21 March 2008. The graffiti appeared following the death of a BBB member after a brawl in Ribnjak park. BBB denied any involvement in either the graffiti or other incidents which had occurred, criticising reporters for "agitation and prejudgement" for stating that Dinamo fans were behind the entire matter. Zagreb's mayor Milan Bandić also offered his support to the Bad Blue Boys, claiming they were wrongly accused and that the entire story was false.

In November 2008, BBB fans were praised by the English media for their support at White Hart Lane in London at a UEFA Cup match against Tottenham Hotspur for continuing to loudly support their team, even when they were losing 4-0.  From 11 August 2010 the Bad Blue Boys were boycotting the club's matches due to their dissent with the club's leadership. The boycott ended on 30 August 2011, but remained active for the European matches in the Champions League that season. In 2011, Bad Blue Boys were mentioned in the list of 16 "hardcore hooligan firms, ultras groups we wouldn't want to mess with", compiled by the American sports website Bleacher Report.

On 24 February 2022, BBB received worldwide recognition and praise for being one of the first sets of supporters to publicly show their support for Ukraine among the ongoing Russian aggression. BBB displayed several Ukraine flags along with a banner that read "Support to the people of Ukraine". The image was subsequently shared on the Instagram stories of the football section of Bleacher Report, Manchester City left-back Oleksandr Zinchenko, and was the main photo in an article from Time magazine. They also chanted "Slava Ukraini" (English: "Glory to Ukraine"). 

They share close relations with Panathinaikos FC (Gate 13), Dynamo Kyiv, Dinamo Tbilisi and A.S. Roma (Fedayn).

References

External links
  

1986 establishments in Croatia
GNK Dinamo Zagreb
Ultras groups
Croatian football supporters' associations